Ulmus 'Rebona' is an American hybrid cultivar raised by the Wisconsin Alumni Research Foundation (WARF) as selection 'W916', derived from a crossing of Japanese Elm clone W43-8 = 'Reseda' with Siberian Elm clone W426 grown from seed collected from a street tree at Yankton, South Dakota. The tree was registered in 1993 by Conrad Appel KG, of Darmstadt (ceased trading 2006) and is a sibling of 'New Horizon' (selection 'W917'). In Europe, 'Rebona' is marketed as a Resista elm  protected under E U breeders' rights (E U council decision 2100/94).

Description

'Rebona' bears a close resemblance to its sibling 'New Horizon', but requires less maintenance owing to a better leader. The tree grows rapidly, developing a fastigiate pyramidal shape with ascending branches. The glossy clear-green leaves are comparatively small, though slightly larger than those of 'New Horizon'.

Pests and diseases
'Rebona' is highly resistant to Dutch elm disease, rated 5 out of 5.

Cultivation
'Rebona' has been widely planted as a street tree in Germany,   the Netherlands, and to a lesser extent in France and the UK.

Synonymy
 'Rebone'

Accessions

Europe
Botanischer Garten Marburg , Marburg, Germany. No details available.
Grange Farm Arboretum, Lincolnshire, UK. Acc. no. not known.
Royal Botanic Gardens, Kew, UK. Acc. no. not known.
Sir Harold Hillier Gardens, Romsey, UK. One tree planted Crookhill overflow parking area. Acc. no. 2018.0019
Wijdemeren City Council, Netherlands. Elm Collection, first planted 2005 De Vijnen, Nederhorst den Berg. Used in elm trials Ankeveen 2009.

Nurseries

Europe
Baumschule Grossbötzl Ort, Austria.
Björkhaga Plantskola Veberöd, Sweden.
Clasen & Co Rellingen, Germany.
Eisele GmbH, Darmstadt, Germany.
Hilliers Nurseries , Liss, UK.
Noordplant , Glimmen, Netherlands.
Pépinières Rouy-Imbert Monfavet-Avignon, France.

References

Hybrid elm cultivar
Ulmus articles with images
Ulmus